Sister chromatid cohesion protein PDS5 homolog A is a protein that in humans is encoded by the PDS5A gene.

References

Further reading